La France is an unincorporated community and census-designated place (CDP) in Anderson County, South Carolina, United States. It was first listed as a CDP in the 2020 census with a population of 476.

La France has a post office with ZIP code 29656, which opened on April 12, 1871.

Demographics

2020 census

Note: the US Census treats Hispanic/Latino as an ethnic category. This table excludes Latinos from the racial categories and assigns them to a separate category. Hispanics/Latinos can be of any race.

References

Unincorporated communities in Anderson County, South Carolina
Unincorporated communities in South Carolina
Census-designated places in Anderson County, South Carolina
Census-designated places in South Carolina